Elmwood is a historic home located at Culpeper, Culpeper County, Virginia. It was built between 1870 and 1874, and is a three-story, double-pile brick dwelling in the Italianate style.  It has a central hall plan with a central hall stairway. Also on the property are the contributing outdoor kitchen and smokehouse.  The interior features well-preserved interior mural paintings by the well-known local artist, Joseph Oddenino.  Oddenino also created the interior of the Mitchells Presbyterian Church.

It was listed on the National Register of Historic Places in 1986. In 2013, the boundaries of the listing were increased to include  of the surrounding farm and several contributing buildings. One of the buildings included is the Browning Store, a store, home and post office built circa 1773.

References

Houses on the National Register of Historic Places in Virginia
Italianate architecture in Virginia
Houses completed in 1874
Houses in Culpeper County, Virginia
National Register of Historic Places in Culpeper County, Virginia